Frederick II of Dießen (also known as Frederick I of Regensburg; 1005 – 1075) was a German nobleman. He is documented as bailiff (Vogt) of the Regensburg cathedral chapter in 1035. He is one of the earliest known ancestors of the Counts of Andechs.

Life 
His father was Count Frederick of Dießen (d. ), a relative of the legendary Bavarian count Rasso (d. 954), who administered the area around Dießen and Haching. His mother was Hemma, a daughter of Duke Conrad I of Swabia.

He became Domvogt of Regensburg in 1035. In 1055, he became Count in the Sempt area.

He died in 1075, as a lay brother in the Sankt Blasien Abbey in the Black Forest.

Marriages and issue 
Frederick married three times:
 Hadamut (d. 1060), a daughter of Eberhard of Eppenstein.  Together, they had one daughter:
 Haziga (c. 1040 – 1 August 1104), also known as Hadegunde, married Herman of Kastl and secondly Otto I, Count of Scheyern
 Irmgard of Gilching.  Together, they had the following children:
 Uta, married Kuno of Rott, Count palatine of Bavaria
 Arnold (d. after 1091), succeeded his father as Count of Dießen
 Frederick, succeeded as Vogt of the cathedral chapter of Regensburg
 Meinhard (d. after 1070), succeeded as Count of Gilching
 Hemma
 Liutgard, married Count Adalbert I of Bogen
 Berthold, Count jure uxoris of Schwarzenburg
 Tuta, a daughter of the Vogt Hartwig I of Regensburg.  This marriage was childless.

Counts of Germany
1005 births
1075 deaths
11th-century German nobility